Suriname–Turkey relations are the foreign relations between Suriname and Turkey. The Turkish ambassador in Port of Spain, Trinidad and Tobago is also accredited to Suriname. Turkey has an honorary consulate in Paramaribo, while Suriname has honorary consulates in Ankara and Istanbul.

Diplomatic Relations 
Diplomatic relations between Turkey and Suriname have been improving consistently since the now infamous December murders. 

On December 8, 1982 Dési Bouterse ordered a group of 13 dissidents, including a newspaper editor, two human-rights lawyers, executed, which came to be known as December murders. The subsequent actions by Bouterse, which included setting fire on the offices of the newspaper Vrije Stem caused a rupture in diplomatic relations between the two countries.

Relations reached an all-time low after the telephone coup, when Bouterse dismissed the democratically-elected Nieuw Front voor Democratie en Ontwikkeling government in 1991.

Diplomatic relations were normalized with the election of  Venetiaan, which re-established relations with the Dutch and Turkey, which led to significant financial assistance from the Dutch and Turkish governments.

Presidential Visits

Trade Relations 
 Trade volume between the two countries was 18.2 million USD in 2019 (Turkish exports/imports: 18.1/0.1 million USD).

See also 

 Foreign relations of Suriname
 Foreign relations of Turkey

References

Further reading 

 Aldershot. Ashgate. “Coalition Governance in Belgium and the Netherlands: Rising Electoral Stability Against all Electoral Odds.” Acta Politica 41 (4): pp. 389–407. 2006. 
 Hoefte, Rosemarijin. Suriname in the Long Twentieth Century. New York: Palgrave Macmillan. 2014. 
 Meel, Peter. “Towards a Typology of Suriname Nationalism.” New West Indian Guide 72 (3&4): pp. 257–281. 1998. 
 Menke, Jack. “Democracy and Governance in Multi-Ethnic Societies: The Case of Suriname.” in Governance in the Caribbean. Edited by Selwyn Ryan and Ann Marie Bissessar. UWI, St. Augustine: UWI School of Continuing Studies. 2013. 
 Thomas, Martin. Crises of Empire: Decolonization and Europe's Imperial States. New York: Bloomsbury Publishing. 2015. 
 Timmermans, A. High Politics in the Low Countries. Functions and Effects of Coalition Agreements in Belgium and the Netherlands. 2003.  

Suriname–Turkey relations
Turkey
Bilateral relations of Turkey